Torri Sherrod Williams (born August 29, 1986) is an American football safety who is currently a free agent. He was signed by the Texans as an undrafted free agent in 2010. He played college football at Purdue.

Early years
Williams was a four-year letterman at Leander High School in Leander, Texas. He was ranked as No. 51 wide receiver in nation by Rivals.com. As a senior, he received an All-Central Texas and unanimous first-team all-district selection after catching 79 passes for 1,841 yards (23.3 average) and 14 touchdowns. He came up with four interceptions, played on three district championship team, and was coached by Steve Gideon.

College years
Williams played for the Purdue University Boilermakers football team in the 2004, 2006, 2007, 2008, and 2009 seasons.

Professional years
Williams played one game for the Houston Texans in 2010 after signing as an undrafted free agent. The Texans waived Williams on August 27, 2012. Williams then signed with the UFL's Virginia Destroyers.

References

External links
Houston Texans bio
Purdue Boilermakers bio
BC Lions bio

1986 births
Living people
Players of American football from Dallas
Players of Canadian football from Dallas
American football safeties
Purdue Boilermakers football players
Houston Texans players
Virginia Destroyers players
BC Lions players